The International School of Seychelles was founded in 1969. It is a co-educational non-profit making school.

A Brief History 
The International School was founded in 1969, as a co-educational non-profit making organisation. The school is owned by the International School Association, of which every parent of children in the school is automatically a member. The school is recognised and licensed by the Ministry of Education, and is a member of ECIS (European Council of International Schools). The school is non-denominational and the religious beliefs of all faiths are respected. Initially the school was established to provide a British style education for the children of expatriates working in Seychelles on temporary contract. During the last thirty years the school has expanded and, since 1994, has welcomed Seychellois children.

Present 
Today these Seychellois students are in the majority, with India, Britain, Australia and South Africa well represented. Originally the school catered only for primary age children, however during the last fifteen years the school has evolved to its present character, where children aged 3 years to 19 years are educated. The curriculum of the school is based upon the National Curriculum for England and Wales. More detailed information about this can be found in the curriculum booklets published annually for each class. The school offers accredited learning programmes that are internationally recognised:

The International General Certificate of Education (IGCSE) is taught at year 10 and 11 level 
AS and A2 Level international qualifications are offered in the Sixth Form. 
The Advanced level programme prepares students for university studies overseas. The majority of Advanced level students do proceed to undergraduate courses after completion of their programme.

All examinations are administered and accredited by the University of Cambridge, UK.

The Principal of the International School Seychelles is Mrs. Elodie Vallantine

Location

International School of Seychelles, Mahe
The school is situated on the outskirts of Victoria in the Mont Fleuri District, Mahe, Seychelles.

Facilities 
All accommodation is purpose built, completed within the last ten years, and can be listed as follows:

Early Childhood Section
Foundation: Six Classrooms
Early Childhood: Six Classrooms
Sand, water play areas and a library.

Junior Section
Twelve classrooms providing accommodation for years 3, 4, 5 and 6, junior computer suite with 30 workstations and offices for the Heads of Sections.
 
Secondary Section
Three science laboratories with prep. room, one computer suite with 30 workstations, one art and multi-media studio, Geography, French, History, three Mathematics classrooms. Locker area for secondary students.

Sixth Form Section
Two study rooms and a research computer suite.

Other features include a 300-seater hall, tuck shop, and a library.

The Staff 

The school is managed by the Principal, Elodie Vallantine, who is responsible to the Board of Governors, which is elected annually by the Association members at a general meeting. The Board consists of the Chair, Priscille Chetty, the Secretary, Preethi Nair, the Treasurer, Paulian Kazibwe. five other elected members are Mr. Corrie Opperman, Mr. Frank Ally, Mr. Chetan Pandya, Mr. Benediste Hoareau and Ms. Alexandra Benoiton.                    
 and up to two nominated members.
The school is divided into four sections, each with its own Head of Section responsible for day-to-day management.

The school employs both Seychellois and expatriate teaching staff in all sections.

Stages of the School
Early Childhood
Each class in the Early Childhood section has a designated teacher, fully qualified and experienced, who is responsible for the academic and pastoral progress of each child. In addition teaching assistants provide crucial curriculum support under the direction of the class teachers. French is taught in years 1 and 2 by a specialist teacher. There is additional support for children with special educational needs (SEN).

Juniors
In the Junior section each class has a fully qualified and experienced designated teacher. Additionally, a specialist teacher provides support in the areas of Physical Education, Computing and SEN. French is also taught by a specialist teacher. Additional support is provided for children with a low standard of English.

Secondary
In the Secondary section all subjects are taught by specialist teachers, under the direction of the Head of Section. There is additional support for children with special educational needs.

Sixth Form
In the Sixth Form all subjects are taught by specialist teachers, under the direction of the Head of Sixth Form.

References

Education in Seychelles
Educational organisations based in Seychelles
Educational institutions established in 1969
1969 establishments in Seychelles